Count Kraft VI of Hohenlohe-Weikersheim (1452 in Neuenstein – 2 August 1503 in Neuenstein) was Canon in Mainz and Speyer.

His parents were Kraft V, Count of Hohenlohe-Weikersheim and Margaret of Oettingen.

Kraft VI married on 26 February 1476 Helene of Württemberg (d. 19 February 1506), daughter of Ulrich V, Count of Württemberg. They had the following children:
 Albert III (1478–1551)
 Margaret (1480–1522)
 George I (1488–1551)
 Elisabeth (1495–1540)

Counts of Hohenlohe
House of Hohenlohe
1452 births
1503 deaths
15th-century German people